Vahitahi Airport  is an airport that serves the village of Mohitu, located on the Vahitahi atoll, in the Tuamotu group of atolls in French Polynesia,  from Tahiti. Vahitahi atoll Airport was inaugurated in 1978.

Statistics

References

External links
 Atoll list (in French)
 Classification of the French Polynesian atolls by Salvat (1985)

Airports in French Polynesia
Atolls of the Tuamotus